The Enforcer (aka Murder, Inc. in the United Kingdom) is a 1951 American film noir co-directed by Bretaigne Windust and an uncredited Raoul Walsh, who shot most of the film's suspenseful moments, including the ending. The production, largely a police procedural, stars Humphrey Bogart and is based on the Murder, Inc. trials. The supporting cast features Zero Mostel and Everett Sloane.

Plot
Under heavy police protection, gangster Joe Rico arrives late at night at the courthouse to testify against crime boss Albert Mendoza. There have already been several attempts on Rico's life but lead prosecutor Martin Ferguson reminds him that he himself faces plenty of charges unless he cooperates. After yet another attempt on his life, Rico gives his bodyguards the slip but falls to his death from the ledge outside the eighth floor window.

Without Rico’s evidence, Mendoza will walk away a free man. However, Ferguson believes that something else came up in the investigation that might make the case, so he and police captain Nelson decide to go through the evidence again. Much of this is told in flashbacks.

The case began when small-time gangster James "Duke" Malloy burst into a police station and claimed to have killed his girlfriend under pressure from others. The police find only an empty grave and Malloy later commits suicide in his cell. Ferguson is brought in on the case and a check on Malloy’s associates leads the investigators to "Big Babe" Lazick. When Lazick refuses to talk, Ferguson threatens to jail his wife and put his son into foster care. Lazick then confesses that he is operating under the orders of Joe Rico, who gets requests to commit murders over the telephone. The killers carry out murders for profit, the idea being that they are hired at the request of someone else. The killer will have no motive for committing the crime and thus will not be suspected by the police, while the client with the motive will have a perfect alibi. Only Rico knows who the top boss is.

Lazick leads the police to the body of Nina Lombardo. It emerges that she was a contract whom Malloy was supposed to kill, but he instead fell in love with her. Though he tried to cover it up, Malloy’s associates caught up with them and forced him to kill her. Nina's roommate, Teresa Davis, tells the detectives that Nina's real name was Angela Vetto and that she was in hiding since her father's murder ten years before. 

The police eventually find a mass grave filled with dozens of bodies. As the authorities close in on them, the gang begins to break up. Rico himself is hiding on a farm with his last remaining accomplices and witnesses their shooting by hired killers sent to silence everyone. Rico then contacts Ferguson, offering to testify against his secret boss, Mendoza. He reports that Tony Veto and his daughter Angela had witnessed Mendoza’s first murder along with her father but now there were no survivors for the prosecution.

Frustrated, Ferguson goes to Mendoza's cell and leaves behind the photos of his victims. He then returns to the evidence room and listens to a tape made of Rico's confession — which is not admissible in court. In it, Rico describes Vetto's daughter as having "big blue eyes"; Ferguson remembers that Nina Lombardo (assumed to be Angela Vetto) had brown eyes. On the other hand, her roommate, Teresa Davis, did have blue eyes and Ferguson concludes that Nina was fingered as Duke's contract by mistake. 

However, from Nina's photo, Mendoza has come to the same conclusion and, through his attorney, sends two of his remaining henchmen after the real Angela Vetto. Ferguson and Nelson arrive at her house to learn that she has gone shopping. The streets are too crowded for them to find her, so Ferguson uses a music store's sidewalk loudspeakers to warn her that her life is in danger and to contact him at the store. Angela does so and Ferguson sets off to meet her, followed by the killers. In the subsequent shootout, Ferguson kills one of the gangsters and the other is arrested. He then escorts Angela safely away to testify against Mendoza.

Cast
 Humphrey Bogart as Dist. Atty. Martin Ferguson
 Zero Mostel as Big Babe Lazick
 Ted de Corsia as Joseph Rico (as Ted De Corsia)
 Everett Sloane as Albert Mendoza
 Roy Roberts as Capt. Frank Nelson
 Michael Tolan as James (Duke) Malloy (as Lawrence Tolan)
 King Donovan as Sgt. Whitlow
 Bob Steele as Herman (as Robert Steele)
 Adelaide Klein as Olga Kirshen
 Don Beddoe as Thomas O'Hara
 Tito Vuolo as Tony Vetto
 John Kellogg as Vince
 Jack Lambert as Philadelphia Tom Zaca
 Patricia Joiner as Teresa Davis / Angela Vetto (uncredited)

Production
Director Bretaigne Windust, an accomplished Broadway director, fell seriously ill during the beginning of shooting, so Raoul Walsh was brought in to finish the film. Walsh refused to take the credit, calling it Windust's work.

This was Bogart's last film for Warner Bros., the studio that had made him a star. Warner only distributed the film. It was produced by United States Pictures, and is now owned by Republic Pictures, a division of Paramount Pictures.

Background
Although largely fictional, the film is based on the real-life investigation into a group of hired killers dubbed by the press as "Murder, Inc." (the film was released under that title in the United Kingdom). It was during this investigation, and the Kefauver hearings, that terms like "contract" (a deal to commit a murder) and "hit" (the actual killing itself) first came into the public knowledge. The gangsters used such codes in case of eavesdroppers or phone tappings by the police.

Bogart's ADA Martin Ferguson is based on Burton Turkus, who led the prosecutions of several members of the Murder, Inc. gang. His book on the case was published at about the same time the film was released.

Ted de Corsia's Joe Rico was probably inspired by Abe Reles. Like Rico, Reles was about to testify against a major crime lord but, although under heavy police guard, was found dead after falling out of the Half Moon Hotel in Coney Island on November 12, 1941. It has never been established for sure if Reles' death was murder, accident or suicide.

Reception

Box Office
According to Warner Bros records, the film earned $1,584,000 domestically and $1,289,000 foreign.

Critical response
When the film was released, the staff at Variety magazine praised director Windust, writing, "The film plays fast and excitingly in dealing with Humphrey Bogart’s efforts to bring the head of a gang of killers to justice. The script uses the flashback technique to get the story on film, but it is wisely used so as not to tip the ending and spoil suspense ... Bretaigne Windust’s direction is thorough, never missing an opportunity to sharpen suspense values, and the tension builds constantly."

Noir analysis
Film critic Dennis Schwartz questioned if the film should be labeled as film noir, writing, "The crime film tells for the first time in film how a mob works and its use of terms such as 'contract', 'hit', and 'finger man.' It is shot in a semi-documentary style and looked more like a crime caper movie than the film noir category most film critics have classified it under."

References

External links
 
 
 
 The Enforcer informational site and DVD review (includes images)
 
 

1951 films
1951 crime drama films
American black-and-white films
Film noir
Films about organized crime in the United States
Films directed by Bretaigne Windust
Films directed by Raoul Walsh
Films scored by David Buttolph
Warner Bros. films
American crime drama films
1950s English-language films
1950s American films